Cristiano Bergodi (born 14 October 1964) is an Italian former professional footballer and a professional football manager, currently in charge of Romanian side Sepsi OSK. He played as a defender.
He still looks up to his favourite player Tudor

Club career
Born in Bracciano, Lazio, Bergodi started to play in the country's first division (Serie A) in 1987, for Pescara Calcio, playing with a total of eight seasons.

He most notably played for Lazio, where he spent seven seasons in the top flight, and retired in 2000 after a brief stint at Maltese club Sliema Wanderers.

Managerial career
After he retired, Bergodi started working as a coach. After a couple of minor league experiences in Italy, he moved into Romanian football, initially with National Bucharest, before achieving his first major successes as Rapid Bucharest manager, winning the Romanian Supercup on 27 July 2007. He also coached Liga I team CFR Cluj during the 2006–2007 season, achieving a place in UEFA Cup.

On 6 October 2007, shortly after Rapid was eliminated from the UEFA Cup in first round, Bergodi resigned, declaring Rapid was "a club of amateurs".

In January 2009, after a break, he signed a half year contract with an extension for another 2 years with Liga I club FC Politehnica Iași.

In June 2009, after his short stint with Politehnica Iași he was appointed Steaua Bucharest's new manager. He replaced Marius Lăcătuș. On 18 September 2009, Bergodi was sacked by Gigi Becali for not allowing him to join the team in the locker at the half-time of the match between Steaua and Sheriff Tiraspol (0–0). Becali's decision attracted extremely negative critics from Steaua fans.

In July 2010 he was presented as new head coach of Italian Serie B club Modena. On 14 November 2011 he was sacked. On 26 February 2012 he was recalled by the same team as head coach.

On 20 November 2012 he, already former player of Pescara for a total of eight seasons, was named new coach of same club, now in Serie A en place of the resigned Giovanni Stroppa.
 
He returned to Rapid București in April 2015. He tried to help them avoid relegation, but he was unable to do it. Between September and December 2015, he coached ASA Târgu Mureș.

He successively served as head coach of Modena in the Serie B league from March to June 2016, failing to save the club from relegation.

On 8 November 2018, he returned to Romania and took control of FC Voluntari. He was sacked in January 2020. On 8 May 2020, he signed a one-year contract with CS Universitatea Craiova.

On 8 October 2021, he took charge of Liga I club Sepsi OSK. He won the Cupa României in 2022, defeating defending champions, and former employers, CFR Cluj, in the final. Sepsi OSK also beat the same opposition to win the Supecupa României in 2022

Honours

Player
Pescara
Serie B: 1986–87

Sliema Wanderers
Maltese Cup: 1999–2000

Manager
Național București
Cupa României runner-up: 2005–06

Rapid București
Supercupa României: 2007

Sepsi OSK 
Cupa României: 2021–22
Supercupa României: 2022

References

1964 births
Living people
People from Bracciano
Association football defenders
Italian footballers
S.S. Lazio players
Delfino Pescara 1936 players
Calcio Padova players
Sliema Wanderers F.C. players
Serie A players
Serie B players
Expatriate footballers in Malta
Italian football managers
Italian expatriate football managers
U.S. Sassuolo Calcio managers
FC Progresul București managers
CFR Cluj managers
FC Rapid București managers
FC Steaua București managers
ASA 2013 Târgu Mureș managers
Modena F.C. managers
Delfino Pescara 1936 managers
FC Voluntari managers
CS Universitatea Craiova managers
Sepsi OSK Sfântu Gheorghe managers
Serie A managers
Liga I managers
Italian expatriate sportspeople in Romania
Expatriate football managers in Romania
Footballers from Lazio
Sportspeople from the Metropolitan City of Rome Capital